Psychrobacter sanguinis is a Gram-negative, strictly aerobic bacterium of the genus  Psychrobacter, which was isolated from human blood in New York.

References

External links
Type strain of Psychrobacter sanguinis at BacDive -  the Bacterial Diversity Metadatabase

Moraxellaceae
Bacteria described in 2012